Charles Grayson (1903–1973) was an American screenwriter. He worked on around forty films between 1936 and 1958. He worked under contract for Warner Brothers for a number of years. Although uncredited in the film final, along with Robert Buckner he was instrumental in reviving the operetta film The Desert Song (1943) by proposing an updated version of an old studio hit.

Selected filmography
 Crash Donovan (1936)
 Breezing Home (1937)
 The Man Who Cried Wolf (1937)
 We Have Our Moments (1937)
 You're a Sweetheart (1937)
 Reckless Living (1938)
 Swing, Sister, Swing (1938)
 Tomorrow at Midnight (1939)
 Hawaiian Nights (1939)
 One Night in the Tropics (1940)
 The Boys from Syracuse (1940)
 Thieves Fall Out (1941)
 Bad Men of Missouri (1941)
 Law of the Tropics (1941)
 Underground (1941)
 Wild Bill Hickok Rides (1942)
 The Noose Hangs High (1948)
 Outpost in Morocco (1949)
 Red Light (1949)
 The Woman on Pier 13 (1949)
 Thunder Across the Pacific (1951)
 Battle Hymn (1957)
 The Barbarian and the Geisha (1958)

References

Bibliography 
 Dick, Bernard F. The Star-spangled Screen: The American World War II Film. University Press of Kentucky, 1996.

External links 
 

1903 births
1973 deaths
American male screenwriters
Writers from Los Angeles
Screenwriters from California
20th-century American male writers
20th-century American screenwriters